Eudoliche osvalda is a moth of the subfamily Arctiinae. It is found on Cuba.

References

 Natural History Museum Lepidoptera generic names catalog

Lithosiini
Endemic fauna of Cuba